Marc Hendrikx (born 2 July 1974 in Hamont, Belgium) is a former professional football (soccer) midfielder. He started his career with KFC Lommelse SK, then moved on to Racing Genk and, in 2001 he got the opportunity to play in the top flight and the Champions League after moving to Anderlecht. In 2004, he spent a single season with Lokeren, before moving to Germinal Beerschot and then Sint-Truiden, where he played until 2009. Hendrikx last played for Eupen.

Honours
Genk
Belgian First Division: 1998–99
Belgian Cup: 1997–98, 1999–2000

Anderlecht
Belgian Super Cup: 2001
Belgian First Division: 2003–04

References

External links

1974 births
Living people
Association football midfielders
Belgian footballers
Belgium international footballers
Footballers from Limburg (Belgium)
Belgian Pro League players
K.R.C. Genk players
R.S.C. Anderlecht players
K.S.C. Lokeren Oost-Vlaanderen players
Beerschot A.C. players
Sint-Truidense V.V. players
K.A.S. Eupen players
UEFA Euro 2000 players
People from Hamont-Achel